Johan Richard Krogness (11 March 1814 – 3 February 1872) was a Norwegian businessperson and politician.

He was born in Trondhjem (now Trondheim, Norway). He  took the examen artium in 1835, but quit higher education after taking only one exam. He was a merchant in Trondhjem for some years before settling at the manor Karlslyst (Karlslyst Gård) in Hommelvigen, where he was a ship-owner and ran a brickworks.

He was elected to the Parliament of Norway in 1854,and was re-elected in 1857, 1859, 1862, 1865, 1868 and 1871, representing the rural constituency of Søndre Trondhjems Amt (now Sør-Trøndelag). He died in February 1872 from "weakness of the chest".

His half-sister Ingeborg Krogness was the mother of Erik Vullum.

References

1814 births
1872 deaths
Norwegian businesspeople
Members of the Storting
Sør-Trøndelag politicians
Politicians from Trondheim